State Highway 347 (SH 347) is a  long state highway in western Colorado. SH 347's southern terminus is at U.S. Route 50 (US 50) east of Montrose, and the northern terminus is at Black Canyon of the Gunnison National Park.

Route description
The route begins in the south at US 50 approximately ten miles east of Montrose and travels north to provide access to Black Canyon of the Gunnison National Park's south rim facilities.

History 
The route was established in 1939 with its current routing. The entire route from US 50 to Black Canyon of the Gunnison National Park was paved by 1960. The national park was upgraded from a national monument in October 1999.

Major intersections

See also

References

External links

347
Transportation in Montrose County, Colorado